The Seaconke Wampanoag Tribe is one of several cultural heritage organizations of individuals who identify as descendants of the Wampanoag people in Rhode Island and Massachusetts. Multiple nonprofit organizations were formed to represent the Seaconke Wampanonag.

The Seaconke Wampanoag Tribe is an unrecognized organization. This organization is neither a federally recognized tribe nor a state-recognized tribe.

Wilfred "Eagle  Heart" Greene (1937–2016), an early leader of this group, identified as being a descendant of Ousamequin (Wampanoag, c. 1581–1661), more commonly known as Massasoit. The group "claims to consist of descendants of Massasoit's band." The group also identifies as being descendants of Annawan, a Wampanoag leader who died in 1676.

Lois "Lulu" Viera Chaffee (1941–2021) of Seekonk was also a founding member of the Seaconke Wampanoag Tribe.

Name 
Seaconke is spelled in many different ways and is the name of a town, Seekonk, Massachusetts, and the Seekonk River, near Providence, Rhode Island. The placename comes from the name of a 17th-century Narragansett sachem (leader). The Wampanoag are an Algonquian language-speaking Native American tribe in New England.

Nonprofit organizations 
In 1997, the Seaconke Wampanoag organized as a 501(c)(3) nonprofit organization in Cranston, Rhode Island, Michael Markley was the secretary in 2020, and Robert Harris was treasurer in 2021. The group's assets were $36,836 in 2020.

In 1998, the Seaconke Wampanoag Tribe–Wampanoag Nation organized as a 501(c)(3) nonprofit organization based in Warwick, Rhode Island. Wilfred Green was the agent. In 1998, Wilfred W. Greene III was president, and Stasia Constantino served as director. The nonprofit status was revoked first in 2012 and again in 2018.

Land 
In Greene v. Rhode Island (2003), Wilfred W. Greene sued Rhode Island and the towns of Cumberland and Woonsocket in U.S. District Court. He claimed 34-square miles of land near the Blackstone River; however, the case was dismissed.

In 2008, Patrick and Gail Conley donated a 6.7-acre lot in Cumberland, Rhode Island, to the organization, in the care of Wilfred Green.
The land, part of the Peterson/Puritan, Inc. site, had hazardous waste and was designated as superfund site by the EPA.

Petition for federal recognition 
Wilfred Green sent a letter of intent to petition for federal recognition as a Native American tribe on behalf of the Seaconke Wampanoag Tribe, then based in Greenwich, Rhode Island, in 1998. However, the Seaconke Wampanoag Tribe never submitted a completed petition for federal recognition.

Proposed state-recognition 
Rhode Island House Bill 7470, an act that "recognizes the Seaconke Wampanoag tribe as a Native American tribe was introduced on February 11, 2022. Since March 1, 2022, the bill has been "held for further study" by committee.

Genetic analysis 
In 2005, researchers from the Genographic Project analyzed genetic variation among members of the Seaconke Wampanoag Tribe in Massachusetts and Rhode Island. Research revealed "that the majority of their mtDNA haplotypes belongs to West Eurasian and African lineages, thus reflecting the extent of their contacts and interactions with people of European and African descent. On the paternal side, Y-chromosome analysis identified a range of Native American, West Eurasian, and African haplogroups in the population, and also surprisingly revealed the presence of a paternal lineage that appears at its highest frequencies in New Guinea and Melanesia."

The human geneticist Bryan Sykes (1947–2020) wrote, "On the matrilineal side, all of the mDNA lineages are of either European or African origin, while the patrilineal Y chromosomes show a range of Native American, European, and African lineages plus one surprise from New Guinea." He continued that "genealogical reconstruction showed that the single Native American Y chromosome was most likely introduced into the tribe by a Cherokee incomer several generations back." He wrote further: "In contrast, the complete absence of Native American mDNA among the Seacnoke Wampanoag came as a great surprise to me, given the usual direction of intermarriage between African and European American incomers and Native American women." Jenny Reardon and Kim TallBear echo these findings: "The Seaconke Wampanoag who were sampled largely trace to European and African populations. Indeed they were shown to have no 'maternal Native American lineages' and only one 'Native American' paternal haplotype in an individual with known Cherokee male ancestry...."

Activities 
The Seaconke Wampanoag Tribe host an annual powwow in Rehoboth, Massachusetts. They have hosted their powwow since 2016.

See also 
 List of unrecognized tribes in the United States

References

External links
 Seaconke Wampanoag Tribe and Seaconke Wampanoag Inc., Providence, RI
 Seaconke Wampanoag Tribe, Seekonk, MA

Cultural organizations based in Massachusetts
Cultural organizations based in Rhode Island
Non-profit organizations based in Rhode Island
1998 establishments in Rhode Island
American people of Melanesian descent
American people of African descent
American people of European descent
Unrecognized tribes in the United States
Wampanoag heritage groups